Prudence Fenton is an American film, television and music video producer. She won a Grammy for producing and co-creating the music video for Peter Gabriel's 1992 single "Steam".

Overview
She began her career creating and animating MTV I.D.s, Pee-wee's Playhouse, and the animated Peter Gabriel rock videos. At the turn of the century she was executive producer for ABC's One Saturday Morning, made up of branded cartoons and live-action bumpers. Fenton also co-created and directed and produced Fat Girl, an animated series of shorts that ran on the Oxygen Media network's X-Chromosome show. She co-created and directed a series for urbanentertainment.com called Driving While Black.

She has won two Emmy Awards for Pee-wee's Playhouse, where she was animation and special effects producer. In 1994, she won a Grammy for producing and co-creating Peter Gabriel's video, "Steam". She also executive produced Peter Gabriel's "Big Time" video, which won Billboard and MTV awards as well. She was executive Producer and Story Editor for the award winning MTV series Liquid Television and with this series brought Beavis and Butt-head to MTV. In 1988, Fenton produced a 20-minute film for Amnesty International illustrating the Universal Declaration of Human Rights using 35 animators from around the world. This film was part of the Sting, Bruce Springsteen, Peter Gabriel Amnesty concert tour that went to many cities and seven continents. The film also won the Lillian Gish award and Los Angeles animation festival award. Fenton has also won many Clio awards for MTV program ids. She is the creator and executive producer of the web series Sub:3 on Shut Up! Cartoons.

Producer 
 Sub:3 (2012) web series (creator, executive producer, writer)
 Red Eye (2002) TV series (executive producer)
 DIRT (Defiant Inthefaceof Rowdy Tyrants) Squirrel (2005) MTV (supervising producer)
 Drew Carey's Green Screen Show (2004) (animation producer)
 Treasure Planet 2 (2002) (development producer)
 Kronk's New Groove (also known as The Emperor's New Groove 2) (2002) (development producer)
 Fat Girl (1999) (Oh! Network) (co-creator, producer and director)
 One Saturday Morning (1997) (TV series) (executive producer, supervising producer) (... aka Disney's One Saturday Morning)
 "Steam" (music video) (1992) Peter Gabriel (producer, co-director)
 Liquid Television (1991–1993) (TV series) (executive producer, story editor)
 Christmas Special (1988) (TV) (animation producer) ... aka Christmas at Pee Wee's Playhouse ... aka Pee-Wee Herman's Christmas Special ... aka Pee-wee's Playhouse Christmas Special
 Pee-wee's Playhouse (1986–1990) (animation and effects producer)
 The Universal Declaration of Human Rights (Amnesty International) (1988) (Producer)
 "Big Time" (music video) (1986) Peter Gabriel (executive producer)

Director 
 Driving While Black (2001) (co-creator and director)	
 X-Chromosome's Fat Girl (1999) (co-creator, producer and segment director)
 One Saturday Morning (1997) (TV series) … aka Disney's One Saturday Morning (co-executive producer)
 Moonwalker (1986) (feature film) Michael Jackson (Opening segment director)

Actress 
 X-Chromosome's Animating Women (herself)
 One Saturday Morning (1997) TV series (Derby the Mouse)

Special effects 
 Pee-wee's Playhouse (1986–1990) TV series (special effects director, animation director)
 A Special Evening of Pee-wee's Playhouse (animation director)
 Pee-wee's Playhouse Christmas Special (animation director)
 Disney's One Saturday Morning (titles)
 Unsolved Mysteries (1987–1989) (effects director)

Artist 
 In 2006, Fenton's collection of paintings titled "The Space Between" was exhibited at the Los Angeles Ghetto Gloss art gallery

Awards

 1994 Grammy Award Best short music video Peter Gabriel Video "Steam"
 1993 MTV Music Video Award Best special effects Peter Gabriel Video "Steam"
 1991 Emmy Award Outstanding achievement in graphics and title design Pee-wee's Playhouse 
 1989 Lillian Gish Award Women in Film Festival Universal Declaration of Human Rights (Film)
 1987 Emmy Award Outstanding achievement in graphics and title design Pee-wee's Playhouse 
 Los Angeles International Animation Festival Best Film in 30-minute category. Universal Declaration of Human Rights
 1983 Clio Award For production of MTV program ID "Subway"
 1982 Clio Award For production of MTV program ID "MTV Sandwich"
 1982 ASIFA Award MTV] ID Concept "Elephant"

Often works with 
 Allee Willis
 Peter Gabriel
 Paul Reubens
 Peter Hastings
 Stephen R. Johnson
 Jeff Stein
 The Walt Disney Company
 Jack Healey

Trivia 

 Was executive Producer and Story Editor for the award winning MTV series Liquid Television and with this series brought Beavis and Butt-head to MTV
 Produced animation on the Kim Possible playtest for Walt Disney World.
 Was producer of Treasure Planet 2 for five months of production. Hired crew, and managed executive approvals with weekly presentations. Storyboard reel completed through Act 1 when Studio shut down movie due to poor box office performance of Treasure Planet 1.
 Was producer for the Kodak media sculpture being built for the courtyard in front of the new Oscar Theater designed by Eddie Sotto The structure appeared to be 3 strands of film 5 stories high suspended down in the shape of a DNA helix. Each 'film frame' was represented by a Panasonic flatscreen TV. She also co-created and produced the media to play on the screens. Assembled the team and figured out the delivery system. Accomplished the mini mock up before project was canceled.
 Co-created Willisville, a story-driven interactive interface for multiple platforms with partner Allee Willis.

See also
Allee Willis
Pee-wee's Playhouse

References

External links
Official Website
Ghetto Gloss art gallery

American film producers
American television producers
American women television producers
Grammy Award winners
Living people
Year of birth missing (living people)
21st-century American women